Thaumatococcus daniellii is a plant species from Africa, known for being the natural source of thaumatin, an intensely sweet protein which is of interest in the development of sweeteners. When the fleshy part of the fruit is eaten, this molecule binds to the tongue's taste buds, causing a sweet sensation that slowly builds and leaves a lingering aftertaste. It is a large, rhizomatous, flowering herb native to the rainforests of western Africa from Sierra Leone to Democratic Republic of the Congo. It is also an introduced species in Australia  and Singapore.

Thaumatococcus daniellii grows three to four meters in height, and has large, papery leaves up to 46 centimeters long. It bears pale purple flowers and a soft fruit containing a few shiny black seeds. The fruit is covered in a fleshy red aril, which is the part that contains thaumatin. In its native range, the plant has a number of uses besides flavoring. The sturdy leaf petioles are used as tools and building materials, the leaves are used to wrap food, and the leaves and seeds have a number of traditional medicinal uses.

Common names for this species include katamfe or katempfe, Yoruba soft cane, and African serendipity berry. It is also sometimes known as miracle fruit or miracle berry (but the unrelated species Synsepalum dulcificum is better known by that name)

A gene from Thaumatococcus daniellii has been inserted into a cucumber plant to increase its perceived sweetness in human eaters by the Warsaw University of Life Sciences.

Description 
Thaumatococcus daniellii is a rhizomatous, perennial herb, up to 3-3.5 m high. The ovate-elliptic leaves (up to 60 cm long and 40 cm wide) arise singly from each node of the rhizome. Inflorescences are single or simply branched spikes' and emerge from the lowest node. The fruit is fleshy, trigonal in shape and matures to a dark red/brown colour when fully ripe. At maturity each fruit contains three black, extremely hard seeds. The seeds are enveloped by a sticky thin, pale yellow basal aril, which contains the sweetening protein, thaumatin.

Varieties
 Thaumatococcus daniellii var. daniellii - western + central Africa from Sierra Leone to Zaire 
 Thaumatococcus daniellii var. puberulifolius Dhetchuvi & Diafouka - central Africa (Zaire, Gabon, Congo-Brazzaville, Cameroon, Central African Republic)

Phytokemikal screening of Thaumatococcus Danielli

Phytochemical	Observation
Alkaloids 	Present
Flavonoids	Present
Tannins	Present
Saponins	Present
Anthraquinones	Present
Anthocyanosides	Present
Cyanogenic glycosides	Absent
Cardiac glycosides 	Cardenolides and steroidal nucleus present

Uses 
Research exploring the benefits which could be derived from the various parts of the T. danielli plant is ongoing in various universities and research institutes globally. It has been shown by a few scientists, such as Ojekale et al. 2010, that this plant also has antimicrobial properties. Further study focuses on its effectiveness against bacteriocin-producing microorganisms (Ajayi et al., 2016). Antimicrobial peptides (AMPs) or proteins produced by bacteria are classified as bacteriocins. They are proteinaceous toxins produced by bacteria to inhibit the growth of similar or closely related bacterial strain(s). If this plant is well studied, it could lead to drug discovery.

Fruit 
The most popular use of T. daniellii is as sweetener. The aril contains a non-toxic, intensely sweet protein named thaumatin, which is at least 3000 times as sweet as sucrose. In West Africa, the aril is traditionally used for sweetening bread, over-fermented palm-wine and sour food. Since the mid-1990s, thaumatin is used as sweetener and flavour enhancer by the food and confectionery industry. Substituting synthetic sweeteners, it is used as a non-caloric natural sweetener. Thaumatin is not a carbohydrate thus it is an ideal sweetener for diabetics.

The seeds of T. daniellii also produce a jelly that swells to 10 times its own weight and hence provides a substitute for agar.
T. daniellii is also used in traditional medicinal uses in the Ivory Coast and Congo. The fruit is used as a laxative and the seed as an emetic and for pulmonary problems.

Leaves 
In West Africa, T. daniellii is mostly cultivated for the leaves. The lamina of the leaves is used for wrapping foods. The petiole is used to weave mats and as tools and building materials. The entire leaf is also used for roofing.

In traditional medicinal use the leaf sap is used as antidote against venoms, stings and bites. Leaf and root sap are used as sedative and for treating insanity.

In Nigeria, the leaves are used for boiling foods such as beans pudding (moi-moi) and beans (adalu), and for wrapping foods such as locust beans (iru), ofada rice (a particular type of rice which is made only in the south-western part of Nigeria; precisely Ogun state), pounded yam (iyan), ekuru (beans pudding without pepper), pap (eko), and so on. Due to its phytoconstituents, it imparts a particular characteristic taste into foods associated with it. It is richly endowed in essential oils.

Cultivation 
There is not a lot known about the physiological and agronomic aspects of this plant.  However, a few studies have been made to examine the factors affecting growth and reproductive development of T. daniellii.

Planting and weed control 
It is relatively easy to propagate T. daniellii from rhizome fragments bearing one or two stools each. Due to the low percentage of germination and the slow growth of the seedling, for commercial propagation, the plant should be established from rhizomes and not from seeds.

Within the first few months after planting, the rhizomes from adjacent plants intermingle and soon the space between the plants will be covered with shoots and leaves. Since the foliage covers the ground completely, weeds are suppressed and weeding is no longer necessary. Therefore, weeding is only essential in the first few months after planting. After soil is covered weeding should be abandoned to avoid damage to flower buds. Weeding should be shallow since the rhizomes and roots are close to the soil surface.
 
Spacing of about 1x1m between plants at planting should be sufficient. Planting in rows is not essential. Closer spacing between the plants results in even quicker ground coverage, which reduces the period of weed control. Trials have shown, that plantation with lower inner-plant spacing (28 cm) show higher inflorescence production than wider spacing (72 cm). A compromise between planting density for maximizing flower production, weed control and ease of fruit collection may be essential.
  
The plant should be grown under shade to prevent severe plant losses during the dry season. In addition growing under shade results in higher fruit yield. Prior shade at planting time is essential if planting is done in the dry season. Enhanced fruit yield can as well be achieved by irrigation during the antecedent dry season.

Flowering and fruiting 
Vegetative growth of T. daniellii is seasonal with flowering and subsequent fruit-set. Main flowering occurs at the beginning of the rainy season, from March to August. Occasional flowers may arise before or after this main season. The duration from flower opening to fruit ripening averages about 13 weeks. Experiments of pollen germination of T. daniellii have shown that self-pollination is almost impossible. Each inflorescence only produces between one and three fruits, formed at or below the ground. T. daniellii plants must attain a certain minimum age after planting before they set fruits. Flowers set during the first year after planting don't produce any fruits.

Harvesting 
Since fruits are formed at or below the ground, harvesting involves searching in the substratum. It would therefore be helpful if the leaves could be clipped at or just before harvesting. Moreover, those leaves could also be used for wrapping or for mat making. Experiments have shown that plants, harvested regularly for leaves and/or petioles, flower less frequently and also set fewer fruits than plants that stay undisturbed. Hence, defoliation of the crop to facilitate fruit collection may have bad consequences for subsequent harvests.
Other experiments however showed that in plants where the leaves were clipped in the dry season there was no decline in subsequent fruit yield. Plants trimmed as late as April have been observed to fruit well the same year. In plots, which are not irrigated, most of the leaves actually die during the dry season. Harvesting the leaves for sale just before the dry season should therefore be economical.

References

External links

Thaumatococcus on www.wikiphyto.org
Aluka Species Profile
PIER Species Profile
Gateway to African Plants

Marantaceae
Flora of West Tropical Africa
Plants described in 1883